Queen Mary's Hospital was a children's hospital in Carshalton, London, England.

History
The hospital was built as the Southern Hospital in 1908. However, as local requirements changed, it was converted into a children's hospital and opened as the Children's Infirmary in 1909. After a visit by Queen Mary it became Queen Mary's Hospital for Children in 1915. Six new blocks were completed in 1930. It was heavily bombed during the Second World War and, after the war, it joined the National Health Service in 1948. After services transferred to St Helier Hospital, Queen Mary's Hospital closed in 1993. Orchard Hill Hospital, a facility providing long-stay mental health services to adults, remains on the site.

References

Defunct hospitals in London
Hospital buildings completed in 1908
Hospitals established in 1908
1908 establishments in England
1993 disestablishments in England